As of 31 December 2020, there are 1,306 functioning jails in India, having 4,88,511 prisoners and actual capacity to house 4,14,033 prisoners. The 1,306 prisons in the country consist of 145 Central Jails, 413 District Jails, 565 Sub Jails, 88 Open Jails, 44 Special Jails, 29 Women Jails, 19 Borstal Schools and 3 Other Jails. Delhi has the highest number of Central Jails while Uttar Pradesh has the highest number of District Jails. Rajasthan has the highest total number of Jails.

States

Andhra Pradesh 
 Rajahmundry Central Prison
 Nellore Central Prison
 Kadapa Central Prison
 Visakhapatnam Central Prison
Besides the above four central prisons, the state has 7 district jails, 99 sub-jails, a women's jail and an open jail.

Arunachal Pradesh 
The state has two district jails at Itanagar and at Tezu respectively.

Assam 
 Guwahati Central Jail, Guwahati
 Tezpur Central Jail, Sonitpur
 Silchar Central Jail, Cachar
 Dibrugarh Central Jail
 Jorhat Central Jail
 Nagaon Central Jail
Apart from the above-mentioned 6 central jails, Assam has 22 district jails, 1 sub-jail, an open jail and a special jail.

Bihar 
 Beur Central Jail, Patna
 Central Jail, Buxar
 Central Jail, Gaya
 Central Jail, Motihari
 Central Jail, Purnea
 Special Central Jail, Bhagalpur
 Shahid Jubba Sahni Central Jail, Bhagalpur
 Shahid Khudi Ram Bose Central Jail, Muzaffarpur
The state also has 31 district jails, 17 sub-jails, a women's jail, an open jail and a special jail.

Chhattisgarh 
 Raipur Central Jail, Raipur
 Jagdalpur Central Jail, Jagdalpur
 Bilaspur Central Jail, Bilaspur
 Ambikapur Central Jail, Ambikapur
 Durg Central Jail, Durg
Chhattisgarh also has 11 district jails and 12 sub-jails.

Goa 
 Aguada Central Jail, Aguada

Goa also has one sub-jail (which is in this case is a women's jail).

A modern central jail is under construction at Colvale, Bardez Goa.

Gujarat 
 Sabarmati Central Jail, Ahmedabad
 Vadodara Central Prison, Vadodara
 Rajkot Central Prison, Rajkot
 Lajpor Central Prison, Surat
Gujarat also has 7 district jails, 11 sub-jails, a women's jail, 2 open jails and 2 special jails.

Haryana 

 Central Jail, Ambala
 Central Jail-I, Hisar
 Central Jail-II, Hisar
Haryana also has 18 district jails.

Himachal Pradesh 
 Model Central Jail, Kanda, Shimla
 Model Central Jail, Nahan, Sirmaur
Himachal Pradesh also has 2 district jails, 8 sub-jails, 1 borstal school and an open air jail.

Jammu and Kashmir 
 Central Jail, Kotbhalwal, Jammu
 Central Jail, Kathidarwara, Srinagar
The state also has 10 district jails, 2 sub-jails and 2 correction centers.

To augment the capacity of jails, the Government is building new jails at Pulwama, Anantnag, Kishtwar, Kargil and Doda (Bhaderwah).

Jharkhand 
 Birsa Munda Central Jail, Ranchi
 Lok Nayak Jai Prakash Narayan Central Jail, Hazaribagh
 Central Jail, Ghaghidh, Jamshedpur
 Central Jail, Medininagar, Palamu
 Central Jail, Deoghar
 Central Jail, Dumka
 Central Jail, Giridih
Jharkhand also has 16 District Jails, 6 Sub Jails, 1 Borstal School and 1 Open Jail cum Rehabilitation Center.

Karnataka 
 Central Prison, Bangalore
 Central Prison, Belgaum
 Central Prison, Bellary (1884)
 Central Prison, Bijapur (1888)
 Central Prison, Gulbarga
 Central Prison, Mysore(1862)
 Central Prison, Dharwad
 Central Prison, Tumkur
Karnataka also has 19 district prisons, 70 sub-jails, 1 borstal school, 1 open jail, 2 special jails and 1 other jail (Juvenile Jail).

Kerala 
 Central Prison, Viyyur, Thrissur
 Central Prison, Poojappura, Thiruvananthapuram
 Central Prison, Kannur
Kerala also has 11 district jails, 16 sub-jails, 3 women's jail, 1 borstal school, 3 open jails, 16 special jails and 1 other jail.

Madhya Pradesh 
 Central Jail, Indore
 Central Jail, Gwalior
 Central Jail, Jabalpur
 Central Jail, Bhopal
 Central Jail, Rewa
 Central Jail, Satna
 Central Jail, Ujjain
 Central Jail, Sagar
 Central Jail, Narsinghpur
 Central Jail, Barwani
 Central Jail, Hoshangabad
Madhya Pradesh also has 41 District Jails, 73 Sub Jails and 6 Open Jails.

Maharashtra 
 Arthur Road Jail, Mumbai
 Harsul Central Jail, Aurangabad
 Yerwada Central Jail, Pune
 Nagpur Central Jail, Nagpur
 Nashik Road Central Jail, Nashik
 Taloja Central Jail, Kharghar
 Kolhapur Central Prison, Kalamba
 Thane Central Prison, Thane
 Amaravati Central Prison, Amaravati
The state also has 28 district jails, 100 sub-jails, 1 women's jail, 1 borstal school, 13 open jails, 1 special jail and 1 other jail.

Manipur 
 Manipur Central Jail, Imphal
 Manipur Central Jail, Sajiwa
There are two district jails at Churachandpur and Chandel. Both are non-functional.

There is also a sub-jail at Jiribam which is temporarily closed.

Meghalaya 
Although the state has 4 district jails, it does not have any central jail.

Mizoram 
 Aizawl Central Jail, Aizawl.

The state also has 6 district jails.

There are 2 district jails (District Jail at Serchhip and District Jail at Mamit) which are currently inoperative because of the lack of armed guards.

Nagaland 
 Central Jail, Chümoukedima.

The state also has 10 district jails.

Odisha 
 Baripada Circle Jail, Mayurbhanj
 Berhampur Circle Jail, Ganjam
 Choudwar Circle Jail, Cuttack
 Koraput Circle Jail, Koraput
 Sambalpur Circle Jail, Sambalpur
The state also has 9 district jails, 73 sub-jails, 1 women's jail, 1 open jail and 2 special jails.

Punjab 
 Jalalabad Central Jail, Ferozpur
 Patiala Central Jail, Patiala
 Ludhiana Central Jail, Ludhiana
 Amritsar Central Jail, Amritsar
 Guradspur Central Jail, Gurdaspur
 Bathinda Central Jail, Bathinda
 Jalandhar Central Jail, Kapurthala
 Faridkot Central Jail, Faridkot
 Central Jail, Hoshiarpur
The state also has 7 district jails, 7 sub-jails, a women's jail (in Ludhiana), a borstal school and an open jail.

Construction work of new jails at Nabha and Mansa was nearing completion as of mid-2016.

Rajasthan 

 Jaipur Central Jail, Jaipur
 Jodhpur Central Jail, Jodhpur
 Central Jail, Udaipur
 Central Jail, Bikaner
 Central Jail, Ajmer
 Central Jail, Kota
 Central Jail (Tihar), Bharatpur
 Central Jail, Sri Ganganagar
 Central Jail, Alwar
The state also has 24 district jails, 60 sub-jails, 2 women's jail, 1 borstal school, 29 open jails and a special jail.

Sikkim 
 State Central Prison, Rongyek
The state also has a district prison at Namchi in South Sikkim.

One more district prison at Omchung was proposed in 2005-06.

Tamil Nadu 
 Coimbatore Central Prison, Coimbatore
 Cuddalore Central Prison, Cuddalore 
 Madurai Central Prison,Madurai 
 Palayamkottai Central Prison, Palayamkottai 
 Puzhal Central Prison I, Puzhal
 Puzhal Central Prison II, Puzhal
 Tiruchirappalli Central Prison, Tiruchirappalli 
 Vellore Central Prison, Vellore
 Salem Central Prison, Salem
The state also has 9 district jails, 96 sub-jails, 3 women's jails, 12 borstal schools, 3 open jails and 5 special jails.
Tamil Nadu Prison Department Contact details are here.

Telangana 
 Chanchalguda Central Jail, Hyderabad
 Cherlapally Central Jail, Cherlapally
 Warangal Central Jail, Warangal
The state also has 7 district jails, 33 sub-jails, a women's jail, a borstal school, 1 open jail and 4 special jails. Telangana State Prisons Department introduced the Video Linkage System between prisons and courts for the first time in the country, which enabled the delivery of speedy justice to prisoners under trial.

Tripura 
 Kendriya Sansodhanagar, Bishalgarh
The state also has 2 district jails and 10 sub-jails. One women's jail also exists in the complex of Kendriya Sansodhanagar, Tripura, Bishalgarh. A new district jail at Ambassa and a new sub-jail at Santirbazar will be opened in the near future.

Uttar Pradesh 
 Naini Central Prison, Allahabad
 Central Jail, Gorakhpur
 Central Jail, Ayodhya
 Central Jail, Etawah
 Central Jail, Varanasi
 Fatehgarh Jail, Fatehgarh
 Aawadha Central Jail, Faizabad
 Bareilly Central Jail, Bareilly
 Agra Jail, Agra
 Sadar Jail, Deoria
Uttar Pradesh has the largest prison department in India and one of the largest around the world consisting of 73 total prisons.

Uttarakhand 
 Central Jail, Sitarganj, Udham Singh Nagar
The state also has 7 district jails, 2 sub-jails and an open jail.

West Bengal 
 Central Jail, Jalpaiguri
 Central Jail, Berhampore
 Central Jail, Midnapore
 Central Jail, Dum Dum,Kolkata
 Central Jail, Presidency, Alipore,Kolkata
 Central Jail, Burdwan
The state also has 12 district jails, 33 sub-jails, 1 women's jails, 2 open jails and 3 special jails.

Union Territories

Andaman and Nicobar Islands 
Andaman and Nicobar Islands has 1 district jail, 3 sub-jails, and a special jail.

Chandigarh 
 Model Jail, Chandigarh

Dadra and Nagar Haveli and Daman and Diu 
Dadra and Nagar Haveli has a sub-jail located at Silvassa. Daman and Diu have 2 special jails, one each at Daman and Diu.

Delhi 

 Central Jail No. 1, Tihar
 Central Jail No. 2, Tihar
 Central Jail No. 3, Tihar
 Central Jail No. 4, Tihar
 Central Jail No. 5, Tihar
 Central Jail No. 6, Tihar
 Central Jail No. 7, Tihar
 Central Jail No. 8, Tihar
 Central Jail No. 9, Tihar
 Central Jail No. 10, Rohini
 Central Jail No. 11, Mandoli
 Central Jail No. 12, Mandoli
 Central Jail No. 13, Mandoli
 Central Jail No. 14, Mandoli
 Central Jail No. 15, Mandoli
 Central Jail No. 16, Mandoli
Delhi also has 2 Open Jails (one for male and female each) and 3 Semi Open Jails.

Lakshadweep 
Lakshadweep has 4 Sub Jails.

Puducherry 
 Central Prison, Kalapet, Puducherry
Puducherry also has 1 Sub Jail and 2 Special Jails.

Decommissioned 
The following Indian prisons have been decommissioned and demolished:
 Cellular Jail, Port Blair
 Madras Central Prison, Chennai
 Bankipur Central Jail, Patna
 Freedom Park, Bangalore
 Musheerabad Jail, Hyderabad
 Viper Island, Andaman Islands
 Central Jail, Ahmedabad, Gujarat
 Ross Island Penal Colony, Port Blair

See also
 Prisons in India

References

External links 
 https://eprisons.nic.in
 https://ncrb.gov.in/en

 
India
Lists of buildings and structures in India
India government-related lists
India law-related lists